Franco Gandini (born 28 July 1936) is an Italian racing cyclist and Olympic champion in track cycling.

He won a gold medal in the team pursuit at the 1956 Summer Olympics in Melbourne (with Antonio Domenicali, Leandro Faggin and Valentino Gasparella).

References

1936 births
Living people
Italian male cyclists
Olympic gold medalists for Italy
Cyclists at the 1956 Summer Olympics
Olympic cyclists of Italy
Italian track cyclists
Sportspeople from Parma
Olympic medalists in cycling
Medalists at the 1956 Summer Olympics
Cyclists from Emilia-Romagna
20th-century Italian people